"Cola" is a song by CamelPhat and Elderbrook, released as a single on 17 June 2017 by Defected Records. It was recorded, co-written, and produced by the British electronic house duo CamelPhat featuring vocals from Alexander "Elderbrook" Kotz, who was also a co-writer of the track.

It reached number one on Billboard's Dance Club Songs chart in November 2017, giving the collaboration their first American chart topper. The single was nominated for a Best Dance Recording at the 2018 Grammy Awards.

Track listing

Charts

Weekly charts

Year-end charts

Certifications

References

External links
 

2017 singles
2017 songs
CamelPhat songs
Elderbrook songs
Big Beat Records (American record label) singles
Electronic songs
House music songs
Song recordings produced by Elderbrook
Songs written by Elderbrook
Songs written by Mike Di Scala